The 2022 Balkan Super League (BSL) season was the 6th season of the premier rugby league competition on the Balkans Region of Europe. The competition operates in addition to the national leagues of the respective nations as a Champions League-style competition. In this season clubs from Serbia, Turkey, Bulgaria, Bosnia and Herzegovina and Montenegro have competed.

Format 
The format featured an incomplete round robin followed by a Grand Final.

2022 Clubs 

Source:

Regular Season

Round 1

Round 2 

Note: Arsenal Tivat withdrew after Round 2

Round 3

Round 4 

Source:

Ladder 

Partizan won the tiebreaker over Dorćol by virtue of a better differential.

Grand Final 

Source:

References 

2022 in rugby league